William Whipple Jr. (January 25, 1731 NS [January 14, 1730 OS] – November 28, 1785) was an American Founding Father and signatory of the United States Declaration of Independence. He represented New Hampshire as a member of the Continental Congress from 1776 through 1779. He worked as both a ship's captain and a merchant, and he studied in college to become a judge. He died of heart complications in 1785, aged 55.

Early life and education 
Whipple was born in Kittery in Massachusetts Bay (now Maine) in the William Whipple House to Captain William Whipple Sr. and his wife Mary (née Cutt). He was educated at a common school until he went off to sea, where he became a ship's master at age 21. He married his first cousin Catherine Moffat in 1767, and they moved into the Moffatt-Ladd House on Market Street in Portsmouth in 1769.  Their son William Whipple III died in infancy. Whipple was a descendant of Samuel Appleton, early settler in Ipswich, Massachusetts.

Whipple earned his fortune participating in the Triangle trade of the West Indies and Africa, with cargo such as wood, rum, and enslaved humans. He established himself as a merchant in Portsmouth in 1759, in partnership with his brother Joseph.

Political career 
In 1775, New Hampshire dissolved the British Royal government and organized a House of Representatives and an Executive Council known collectively as a Provincial Congress, and Whipple was elected to represent Portsmouth. He became a member of the Committee of Safety. He was then elected to the Continental Congress, and he signed the United States Declaration of Independence. He was the second cousin of fellow signatory Stephen Hopkins. In January 1776, Whipple wrote to fellow signatory Josiah Bartlett of the approaching convention: 

This year, my Friend, is big with mighty events. Nothing less than the fate of America depends on the virtue of her sons, and if they do not have virtue enough to support the most Glorious Cause ever human beings were engaged in, they don't deserve the blessings of freedom.

Whipple freed his enslaved servant, Prince Whipple, believing that no man could fight for freedom and hold another in bondage. He wrote: 

A recommendation is gone thither for raising some regiments of Blacks. This, I suppose will lay a foundation for the emancipation of those wretches in that country. I hope it will be the means of dispensing the blessings of Freedom to all the human race in America.

Military career
Whipple was given his first commission by the New Hampshire Provincial Congress in 1777. At Saratoga, Whipple was placed in command of a brigade, consisting of four regiments of militia. Whipple commanded Bellow's regiment, Chase's regiment, Moore's regiment, and Welch's regiment. As a result of their meritorious conduct at the Battle of Saratoga, Whipple and Colonel James Wilkinson were then chosen by Major General Horatio Gates to determine terms of capitulation with two representatives of General John Burgoyne. Whipple then signed the Convention of Saratoga, the effective surrender of General Burgoyne and his troops. 

Whipple was then appointed along with several other officers to escort Burgoyne and his army back to Winter Hill, Somerville, Massachusetts. Whipple passed the news of the victory at Saratoga to Captain John Paul Jones, who informed Benjamin Franklin, who was in Paris at the time. News of the victory proved valuable to Franklin throughout alliance negotiations with the French. In 1778, Whipple followed his commanding officer, General John Sullivan to the Battle of Rhode Island, where he commanded Evans' regiment, Peabody's regiment, and Langdon's light horse regiment. After General Sullivan ordered retreat, Whipple and other officers resided in a house near the battlefield. The approaching enemy fired a field piece from a range of three-quarters of a mile. The shot tore through a horse lashed outside the house and severely wounded the leg of one of Whipple's brigade majors, which later required amputation.

Death 

After the war, Whipple became an associate justice of the Superior Court of New Hampshire. On November 28, 1785, He suffered from a heart ailment and died after fainting from atop his horse while traveling his court circuit. He was buried in what is now the North Cemetery in Portsmouth, New Hampshire. His headstone was replaced with a new memorial in 1976 in conjunction with the United States Bicentennial.

See also
 New Hampshire Historical Marker No. 114: North Cemetery
 William Whipple House, his birthplace in Kittery
 Memorial to the 56 Signers of the Declaration of Independence

References

Further reading
State Builders: An Illustrated Historical and Biographical Record of the State of New Hampshire. State Builders Publishing Manchester, NH 1903
Lives of the Signers to the Declaration of Independence. By Rev. Charles A. goodrich, published by William Reed & Co. New York 1829

External links

Biography by Rev. Charles A. Goodrich, 1856
Burial site of William Whipple
Genealogical Reference

Colonial Hall
William Whipple and the Declaration of Independence.

1730 births
1785 deaths
Continental Congressmen from New Hampshire
18th-century American politicians
Militia generals in the American Revolution
New Hampshire militiamen in the American Revolution
Politicians from Portsmouth, New Hampshire
Signers of the United States Declaration of Independence
People of colonial New Hampshire
People of New Hampshire in the American Revolution
People of colonial Maine
Appleton family
American people of English descent
American Congregationalists
American slave owners
People from Kittery, Maine
People of pre-statehood Maine
Burials in New Hampshire
Founding Fathers of the United States